Hypsalonia is a genus of spur-throated grasshoppers in the family Acrididae. There are at least 6 described species in Hypsalonia.

Species
 Hypsalonia merga Gurney & Buxton, 1963
 Hypsalonia miwoki Gurney & Eades, 1961
 Hypsalonia petasata Gurney & Eades, 1961
 Hypsalonia rentzi Gurney & Eades, 1961
 Hypsalonia satur (Scudder, 1897)
 Hypsalonia tioga Gurney & Eades, 1961

References

 Capinera J.L, Scott R.D., Walker T.J. (2004). Field Guide to Grasshoppers, Katydids, and Crickets of the United States. Cornell University Press.
 Otte, Daniel (1995). "Grasshoppers [Acridomorpha] C". Orthoptera Species File 4, 518.

Further reading

 

Melanoplinae